Rondell Christopher Mealey (born February 24, 1977) is a former American football running back in the National Football League.

Early life
Rondell Mealey was born in New Orleans, Louisiana and grew up in Norco, Louisiana. He played high school football at Destrehan High School (Destrehan, Louisiana) where he was a teammate of NFL Hall of Fame safety Ed Reed.

College career
Mealey (#7) played collegiately for the LSU Tigers from 1995 to 1999. Mealey redshirted in 1995 and during his freshman season in 1996, rushed for 603 yards and 10 touchdowns.

In 1997 during his sophomore season, Mealey rushed for 664 yards and scored 7 touchdowns. Following the regular season, Mealey put on a performance in the 1997 Independence Bowl against Notre Dame that led to him being inducted into the Independence Bowl Hall of Fame in June 2010. With LSU losing 6-3 at halftime, Mealey filling in for an injured Kevin Faulk, rushed for 222 yards and two fourth-quarter touchdowns to lead LSU to a 27-9 victory.

During his junior season in 1997, Mealey continued to split carries with All-American Kevin Faulk. He was the second leading rusher on the team, rushing for 334 yards and 4 touchdowns. In 1998 as a senior offensive team captain and starting tailback, Mealy was the leading rusher on the team, rushing for 637 yards and 8 touchdowns.

Mealey finished his career at LSU as the sixth-leading rusher in school history. His 29 rushing touchdowns tied for the fifth most in school history and his average of 4.9 yards per carry tied for the third best in school history.

College honors
1996 Freshman All-SEC by the Knoxville News Sentinel
1997 Independence Bowl Offensive MVP
 1999 National "L" Club Award
 Member of the 1999 Blue–Gray Football Classic
 Member of the 2000 East–West Shrine Game
 Member of the 2000 Senior Bowl
 Member of the Independence Bowl Hall of Fame
Sources:

College statistics

Notes:
 * Does not include bowl games

Pre-Draft

Professional career
Rondell Mealey was drafted in the seventh round (252nd pick overall) of the 2000 NFL Draft by the Green Bay Packers. As a Packer from 2000 to 2002, Mealey mainly served as a backup running back and played on special teams seeing playing time in 13 games over three seasons. He had his first NFL start in early September during the 2002 season. Mealey was placed on waivers by the Packers in late September 2002.

Despite interest and tryouts for the Detroit Lions, Houston Texans and Tampa Bay Buccaneers, Mealey did not play professionally again after being released by the Packers.

NFL statistics

Sources:

Personal life
Mealey works for Marathon Oil in southern Louisiana.

See also
 LSU Tigers football statistical leaders

References

External links
 LSU Tigers bio

1977 births
Living people
People from Norco, Louisiana
Players of American football from New Orleans
American football running backs
LSU Tigers football players
Green Bay Packers players
Destrehan High School alumni